Ascalenia subusta is a moth in the family Cosmopterigidae. It was described by Edward Meyrick in 1921. It is found on Java in Indonesia.

References

Moths described in 1921
Ascalenia
Moths of Indonesia